Dario Tanda (born 2 January 1995) is a Dutch footballer who plays as an attacking midfielder for SV Sportlust Glanerbrug. He formerly played for FC Twente and Go Ahead Eagles.

Born to Italian parents, Tanda has Italian-Dutch dual citizenship.

Tanda played for Danish club Vendsyssel FF for 5 days.

References

External links
 Voetbal International profile 

1995 births
Living people
Footballers from Deventer
Dutch people of Italian descent
Dutch footballers
Netherlands youth international footballers
Association football midfielders
FC Twente players
Go Ahead Eagles players
PEC Zwolle players
Eredivisie players
Eerste Divisie players
Dutch expatriate sportspeople in Denmark
Expatriate men's footballers in Denmark
Dutch expatriate footballers
Vendsyssel FF players
Jong FC Twente players